John Youl (30 June 1773 – 25 March 1827) was an Australian Anglican priest, Congregationalist minister and landowner. Youl was the first chaplain to northern Tasmania.  He was born in London, England and died in Tasmania.

See also

References

Australian Anglican priests
Australian Congregationalist ministers
English emigrants to colonial Australia
1773 births
1827 deaths
Anglican clergy from London